Oegoconia caradjai is a species of gelechioid moth. It is known from most of Europe, except Fennoscandia and the north-east. It is also found in New Zealand, as an established exotic.

The wingspan is about 15 mm. Adults are on wing from June to August in a single generation in western Europe. Indoors, they can be observed till October.

The larvae feed on leaf litter, vegetable detritus, rotten leaves and can also be found in waste of straw in barns and stables. Pupation takes place in a loose cocoon, covered with excrements amongst leaf litter.

Systematics and taxonomy
It belongs to the subfamily Symmocinae, which is sometimes included in the case-bearers (Coleophoridae) or united with the concealer moth subfamily Autostichinae. Oegoconia is the type genus of the symmocid subfamily Oegoconiinae (or tribe Oegoconiini, if the symmocids are merged into another family).

References

Oegoconia
Moths described in 1965
Moths of Europe
Moths of New Zealand